Sang Dar Meydan may refer to:
 Sang Dar Meydan-e Olya
 Sang Dar Meydan-e Sofla